Brome was a federal electoral district in the province of Quebec, Canada, that was represented in the House of Commons of Canada from 1867 to 1925.

It was created by the British North America Act, 1867, and was amalgamated into the Brome—Missisquoi electoral district in 1924.

The County of Brome consisted of the Townships of Bolton, Potton, Sutton, Brome and the eastern part of the Township of Farnham.

Members of Parliament

This riding elected the following Members of Parliament:

Election results

By-election: On Mr. Dunkin being called to the Privy Council and appointed Minister of Agriculture, 16 November 1869

By-election: On Mr. Dunkin being appointed Puisne Judge, Superior Court of Quebec, 25 October 1871

By-election: On Mr. Chandler's death, 21 August 1880

By-election: On Mr. Dyer being unseated

By-election: Mr. Fisher appointed Minister of Agriculture, 11 July 1896

See also 

 List of Canadian federal electoral districts
 Historical federal electoral districts of Canada

External links
Riding history from the Library of Parliament

Former federal electoral districts of Quebec